Kałmuki  is a village in the administrative district of Gmina Panki, within Kłobuck County, Silesian Voivodeship, in southern Poland. Its population is around 254.

References

Villages in Kłobuck County